Combine may refer to:

Machinery 
 Combine harvester, or combine, a machine to harvest grain crops
 Seed drill, or combine seeder, a machine to plant seeds

Company structure 
 Corporate group, an industrial business group in Western democracies
 Combine (Soviet enterprise), an industrial business group in socialist countries, particularly the former Soviet Union

Places 
 Combine, Texas, U.S.

Sports 
 A sports combine, an event held by certain professional sports leagues to evaluate prospective players, such as:
 AFL Draft Combine in Australian rules football
 CFL Combine in Canadian football
 NBA Draft Combine in basketball
 NFL Scouting Combine in American football

Other 
 Combine car, or combine, a type of railroad car which combines sections for passengers and freight
 Combine painting, a type of artwork
 COMBINE, a computational biology initiative
 Combine (Half-Life), a fictional alien enemy force from the Half-Life video game series
 The Combine (group), an organized crime group
 The Combine (Australian film industry)
 Combine Music Group, a defunct music publisher
 Combine (API), a reactive programming framework for Swift

See also
 
 
 Combination (disambiguation)
 Combined (disambiguation)
 Combiner
 CombineZ, image processing software
 Merge (disambiguation)
 Unite (disambiguation)